The Barnett Bank Tennis Classic is a defunct WTA Tour affiliated tennis tournament played in the autumn of 1974 and 1975. It was held in Orlando, Florida in the United States and played on outdoor clay courts. The 1974 edition was part of the Virginia Slims Circuit while the 1975 edition was part of the Women's International Grand Prix circuit.

Results

Singles

Doubles

See also
 United Airlines Tournament of Champions – women's tournament in Orlando (1980–1985)

References

Clay court tennis tournaments
WTA Tour
Defunct tennis tournaments in the United States